Hossein Hosseini (born January 19, 1995, in Savojbolagh, Iran) is an Iranian football midfielder who currently plays for Naft Tehran in the Persian Gulf Pro League.

Club career

Club career statistics

References

1995 births
Living people
Iranian footballers
Naft Tehran F.C. players
Esteghlal F.C. players
Association football midfielders